Edge of the Empire is a 2010 Thai historical film directed by Nirattisai Kaljareuk. Set in southern Mongolia over 1,000 years ago, the story relates the history of the small tribe called Tai, a colony ruled by the Great Han at that time. This film shows how the Tai people, oppressed by their Han overlords, unite to fight for their freedom.

Plot
A young warrior tries to stand up to a violent and oppressive empire in 12th-century Thailand. This is a violent 8th century uprising of a Thai tribe against the impending might of the Imperial Chinese army in a battle for supremacy between the war ravaged nations.

Cast
 Ad Carabao
 Alisa Sontirod
 Arnut Rapanit
 Dilok Thongwattana
 Kanta Kaljareuk
 Sara Leigh

Reception

References

External links
 

2010 films
Thai-language films
2010s historical films
2010s war films
Thai historical films
Thai war films